Michael McKenna (born 4 January 1991) is a Scottish footballer who plays as a midfielder for Arbroath.

Career
Born in Edinburgh, McKenna spent time in Hibernian's youth academy before joining Musselburgh Athletic in 2012. In the summer of 2014, McKenna signed for Scottish Championship side Livingston on a one-year contract. In summer 2015, McKenna joined Berwick Rangers. Having already signed a pre-contract agreement with the club, McKenna signed for Arbroath for an undisclosed fee in January 2018.

Career statistics

Honours
Arbroath
 Scottish League One: 2018–19

Individual
Scottish Championship Top Scorer: 2021–22
  
PFA Scotland Players' Player of the Year: 2021–22 Scottish Championship

References

External links
 
 
 

Living people
1991 births
Footballers from Edinburgh
Scottish footballers
Association football midfielders
Musselburgh Athletic F.C. players
Livingston F.C. players
Berwick Rangers F.C. players
Arbroath F.C. players
Scottish Professional Football League players